Laua-an, officially the Municipality of Laua-an,  is a 4th class municipality in the province of Antique, Philippines. According to the 2020 census, it has a population of 26,580 people. Making it 12th most populous municipality in the province of Antique. Laua-an celebrates its Pahinis Festival every January.

Geography

According to the Philippine Statistics Authority, the municipality has a land area of  constituting  of the  total area of Antique.

Climate

Barangays

Laua-an is politically subdivided into 40 barangays., 12 of which are located along the coast and the rest are considered inland/upland barangays located along two big rivers of Paningayan and Cairawan. It has a total of 85 sitios, The total land area of Laua-an is approximately 18,692,456.5 hectares, representing 7.41% of the total land area of the Province of Antique. Of the total land area 7,832,222.9 has. Or 42% is alienable and disposable land and 10,860,2336 has. Or 58% is classified as timber land. Total Population of Laua-an in 2009 as per survey conducted by the Municipal Social Work and Development Office (MSWDO), reached to 26,959 in which 13,468 are males and 13,491 are females with total households of 5,392.

Demographics

In the 2020 census, Laua-an had a population of 26,580.

Economy 

Laua-an has an agricultural-based economy with rice, sugarcane and corn as primary crops. About 4,267,264 has. are devoted to agricultural crop production representing 22.83% of the total land area of the municipality. Laua-an produce Rice, Corn, Vegetables, Peanuts, Mango, Banana, Abaca and other crops. It has 42 Day Care Centers, 12 Complete Elementary Schools and 4 Secondary Schools. In Health services, it has 1 Rural Health Center, 8 Barangay Health Stations and 13 Health & Nutrition Posts. Laua-an has a total of 76.065 km. of Barangay roads; 2.160 km. of municipal roads; 2.450 km. of provincial roads and 11.125 km. of National Roads. A mini-hydro project is being constructed at Brguy. San Ramon by Sun West Water and Electric Company and at Sitio Sadsadan, Barangay Maybunga and Villa Siga Bugasong. Four cell sites (Globe, Sun and Smart) were installed at Barangay Poblacion, Bagongbayan and Liya-Liya rerspectively. It is observed that even upland barangays have signal which contributed to the improvement of information technology in the area.

Farming is the major occupation of the people and fishing is the secondary source of income. The deep sea waters of Sulu Sea is abundant with fish and marine life like sardines, tuna, squids, mackerel, crabs and other seafoods which is a source of living for most residents.

Tourism

Among the tourist attractions are Mount Igmatongtong in barangay Capnayan, Maybunga Water falls in barangay Maybunga, and Estaka Hill in barangay Poblacion. Estaca Hill in the Poblacion provides a strategic place to view the barangay Poblacion, the Sulu Sea and its environs.

Festivals
Pre-Catholic pre-Spanish Indianized Srivijaya-era Pahinis Festival similar to Makar Sankranti, is celebrated annually to feature the muscovado sugar industry of the town, the technology of which dates back to the Spanish era. "Pahinis" means to clean and prepare the tools for sugarcane milling which corresponds to a celebration to thank God for a fine harvest of sugarcane.

The town celebrates its centennial foundation in January 2015. Weeklong celebration features Pahinis Festival Mardi Gras; LGU, professionals, senior citizens and barangay night; Bugal Kang Laua-an (Pride of Laua-an) Awards Night; and Search for Hara de Pahinis (Pahinis Queen) Beauty Pageant and Coronation Night. The winner of this pageant represents the municipality during the Search for Lin-ay kang Antique (Miss Antique) during the Binirayan Festival in the capital town of San Jose de Buenavista every last week of December. Other events include boat racing along the Sulu Sea, and Aring Beach Festival at the last night of the celebration in Barangay Cadajug.

References

External links
 [ Philippine Standard Geographic Code]

Municipalities of Antique (province)